Francis Bickerstaffe-Drew , better known as John Ayscough and born Francis Browning Bickerstaffe, (11 February 1858 – 3 July 1928) was a British writer and Roman Catholic priest.

Biography
Born in Headingley, Leeds, the younger son of Harry Lloyd Bickerstaffe, an Anglican cleric, and Elisabeth Mona Brougham Drew, the daughter of Pierce Drew of Heathfield Towers, Muckridge, Youghal, County Cork, Ireland.
He had one sibling, an elder brother, Pierce. 

In 1878, he converted to Roman Catholicism, while an undergraduate at Pembroke College, Oxford. Bickerstaffe-Drew was ordained as a Catholic priest in 1884 and served as a chaplain in the British Army for more than thirty years. He was made a private Papal Chamberlain by Pope Leo XIII in 1891 and by Pius X in 1903, was a member of the Pontifical Chamber of Malta.

Bickerstaffe-Drew died in Salisbury, England on 3 July 1928, aged 70.

Distinctions
 Honorary degree from the University of Notre Dame
 Honorary degree from the Marquette University
 Knight of the Order of the Holy Sepulchre
 Pro Ecclesia et Pontifice (1901)

Works

 Oremus: or, Little Mildred (1880).
 Dominus Vobiscum: or, The Sailor Boy (1880).
 Veni Creator; or, Ulrich's Money (1881).
 Pater Noster; or, An Orphan Boy (1881).
 Per Jesum Christum: or, Two Good Fridays (1881).
 Ave Maria; or, Catesby's Story (1882).
 Credo; or, Justin's Martyrdom (1882).
 Ora Pro Nobis (1883).
 Marotz (1908).
 Mr. Beke of the Blacks (1908).
 Dromina (1909).
 A Roman Tragedy and Others (1909).
 San Celestino (1909).
 Outsiders—and In (1910).
 Mezzogiorno (1911).
 Hurdcott (1911).
 Faustula N. A.D. 340 (1912).
 Gracechurch (1913).
 Levia-pondera: An essay book (1913)
 Monksbridge (1914).
 Prodigals and Sons (1914).
 French Windows (1918).
 Jacqueline (1918).
 The Tideway (1918).
 Fernando (1919).
 Abbotscourt (1920).
 First Impressions in America (1921).
 Discourses and Essays (1922).
 Mariquita (1922).
 Pages from the Past (1922).
 Dobachi (1923).

Selected articles
 "Isolation and Federation," The American Ecclesiastical Review (1913).
 "A Dog and a Bad Name: Some Notes on the Novel and its Present Function," The American Catholic Quarterly Review (1913).
 "Picture Teaching," The American Catholic Quarterly Review (1914).
 "A Novelist's Novel-Reading," The Catholic World (1915).

Short stories
 "A Beginning—At Railham," Part II, Part III, The Catholic World (1913–1914). 
 "The Sacristans," The Catholic World (1915).

References

Further reading
 Adams, J.R. (1922). "The Modern Catholic Novel," The American Catholic Quarterly Review, Vol. XLVII, pp. 130–135.
 Bickerstaffe-Drew, F. (1919). John Ayscough's Letters to his Mother during 1914, 1915 and 1916. New York: P.J. Kenedy & Sons. 
 Braybrooke, Patrick (1931). "John Ayscough; Priest and Novelist." In: Some Catholic Novelists: Their Art and Outlook. London: Burns, Oats & Washbourne, Ltd.
 Gerrard, Thomas J. (1911). "The Real Romance of Life," The Catholic World, Vol. XCIII, No. 553, pp. 1–16.
 Martin, Arthur A. (1915). A Surgeon in Khaki. London: Edward Arnold.

External links

 
 Works by Bickerstaffe-Drew, at Hathi Trust
 Works by Bickerstaffe-Drew, at Europeana
 National Portrait Gallery: Francis Browning Drew Bickerstaffe-Drew

1858 births
1928 deaths
19th-century English novelists
20th-century English novelists
English religious writers
English children's writers
Roman Catholic writers
Converts to Roman Catholicism from Anglicanism
19th-century English Roman Catholic priests
20th-century English Roman Catholic priests
Alumni of Pembroke College, Oxford
English Roman Catholics
English male novelists
Knights of the Holy Sepulchre
Commanders of the Order of the British Empire